George Kotsonaros (October 16, 1892 in Nafplio, Greece – July 13, 1933 in Eutaw, Alabama) was a Greek-born professional wrestler and film actor. He acted mostly in silent pictures. His original name was Giorgios Demetrios Kotsonaros. He emigrated to the United States in July 1910.

His swarthy, menacing face—and pugilist's rearranged nose—got him many roles as a tough guy or a prizefighter at a time when boxing movies were a flourishing subgenre due to the sport's huge popularity with the public.

Most of Kotsonaros's films are today considered lost. Later, Kotsonaros began a career in professional wrestling. 

On July 13, 1933, Kotsonaros was driving through Alabama when his car overturned, killing him.

Filmography

Honeymoon Lane (1931) as Nolay
Dangerous Paradise (1930) as Pedro    Two Against Death (USA: alternative title)
The Body Punch (1929) as Paul Steinert
The Shakedown (1929) as Battling Roff
We Faw Down (1928) as One-Round Kelly (uncredited)  a.k.a. We Slip Up (UK)
Beggars of Life (1928) as Baldy (uncredited)
Street of Sin (1928) as Iron Mike
The Fifty-Fifty Girl (1928) as Buck (the Gorilla Man)
The Love Mart (1927) as Fleming Henchman (uncredited)
The Private Life of Helen of Troy (1927) as Hector  a.k.a. Helen of Troy (USA)
The Wizard (1927) as The Gorilla
King of the Jungle (1927, serial)
Catch-As-Catch-Can (1927) as Butch
The Tender Hour (1927) as The Wrestler
When a Man Loves (1927) as Convict Prisoner (uncredited)  a.k.a. His Lady (UK)
While London Sleeps (1926) as The Monk
Cupid's Knockout (1926)
 The Fighting Doctor (1926)
Vanishing Millions (1926)

References

External links
 

1892 births
1933 deaths
American male film actors
American male silent film actors
Greek male silent film actors
20th-century American male actors
Road incident deaths in Alabama
People from Nafplion
Greek emigrants to the United States
20th-century Greek Americans